The 10th Infantry Regiment "(10 ΣΠ)" is a motorized infantry Regiment of the Hellenic Army. Headquartered in Serres and subordinated to the III Army Corps, it was formed from the former 10th Infantry Division (Χ Μεραρχία Πεζικού) on 1 July 2004.

History

Early 20th century 

The 10th Infantry Division was originally formed in March 1913, in preparation for the Second Balkan War, where it participated. After the end of the war it was based at Veroia. It remained loyal to the royal government during the National Schism, and was withdrawn to Thessaly. After the Noemvriana, the 10th Infantry Division was again moved to Tripoli in the Peloponnese, where it was disbanded in early 1917. In 1919, following the Greek landing at Smyrna, the Smyrna Division (Μεραρχία Σμύρνης) was formed there, which in November 1920 was renamed as the 10th Infantry Division. The division distinguished itself during the Asia Minor Campaign, particularly in the Battle of Afyonkarahisar–Eskişehir. During the Greek retreat in August 1922, it retreated orderly and evacuated over the Marmara Sea to Eastern Thrace. During the next few years it remained based in Veroia. It fought during the Greco-Italian War of 1940–41 and was disbanded after the Greek capitulation in April 1941.

It was re-established at Thessaloniki in 1946 as the 10th Mountain Division (Χ Ορεινή Μεραρχία) and fought in the Greek Civil War under III Army Corps. Renamed to 10th Infantry Division, it was moved to Serres in July 1950, where it remains to this day. It received the honor title "Rupel" in 2000, in memory of the Rupel Fortress.

Current use
It was reorganized as the 10th Infantry Brigade (10η Ταξιαρχία Πεζικού) on 1 July 2004, coming under the control of I Army Corps, but was reformed as a mechanized infantry unit in November 2009 and subordinated to III Army Corps. It re-acquired a national role after having been reduced to a headquarters-only formation for NATO use.

Structure 

 Headquarters Company (ΛΔ/10ου ΣΠ) located at Serres.

 10th Signals Company (10 ΛΔΒ)

 10th Engineer Company (10 ΛΜΧ)

 567th Motorized Infantry Battalion (567 M/Π ΤΠ) at Sidirokastro.

 518th Motorized Infantry Battalion (518 M/Π ΤΠ) located at Kato Nevrokopi.

 10th Support Battalion (10 ΤΥΠ)

References

External links

Mechanized infantry brigades of Greece
2004 establishments in Greece
Military units and formations established in 2004
Serres (regional unit)